Abu'l-Mawahib al-Shinnawi or Abu'l-Mawahib Ahmad ibn Ali ibn Abd al-Quddus al-Shinnawi (Arabic: أحمد بن علي بن احمد بن عبد القدوس ابن محمد الشناوي أبو المواهب ) also known as "al-Khami" or al-Hanna'i (Arabic: الحنائي ) is a master of Shattariyya Sufi order.

His life 

He was born in a well-known Sufi family al-Shinnawi in 975 H.E./1568 A.D. in Mahallat Ruh, west of Cairo. His father Ali ibn Abd al-Quddus al-Shinnawi was a popular leader and Ahmadi shaykh (after Ahmad al-Badawi (d. 675 H.E./1276 A.D.)). He moved to Medina and settled there for religious studies. Later he became a prominent Sufi and the leading shaykh for Naqshabandiyya in Medina in his time. The order was ordered to Medina with Shattariyya by the Indian shaykh Sibghatallah ibn Ruhallah al-Sindi al-Barwaji.

He died in 1028 H.E/1619 A.D. His many students included Safi al-Din al-Qushashi who venerated his teacher as the saintly "Seal of the Time".

His works 

Al-Baghdadi and Brockelmann listed 18 respectively 5 of al-Shinnawi's work.

 al-Irshad 'ila Sabil al-Rashad
 Ifadat al-Jud fi wahdat al-Wujud
 al-Iqlid al-Farid fi Tajrid al-Tawhid
 Bay'at al-Itlaq
 al-Ta'sil wa al-Tafdil
 Tajalliyah al-Basa'ir Hashiyat 'ala Kitab al-Jawahir li al-Gawth al-Hindi
 Khulasat al-Ikhtisas wa ma li'l-kul min al-Khawas
 Diwan Shi'r al-Shinnawi
 al-Sultat al-Ahmadiyyah fi Rawa'ih Mada'ih al-Dhat al-Muhammadiyah
 Si'at al-Itlaq
 Shifa' al-Ghiram fi Akhbar al-Kiram
 Sadihat al-Azal wa Sanihat al-Nazal
 al-Suhuf al-Namusiyyah wa al-sikhuf al-Nawusiyyah
 Dama'ir al-Sara'ir al-Ilahiyyah fi Bawahir 'Ayat Jawahir al-Ghawthiyah
 Fat'h al-Ilah fi ma Yuqal dubur kull al-Salat
 Fawatih al-Salawat al-Ahmadiyyah fi Lawa'ih Mada'ih al-Dhat al-Ahmadiyyah
 Manahij al-Ta'sil
 Mawjat al-Rahmah wa Mawthiqat al-'Ismah

References 

Egyptian Sufi religious leaders
1568 births
1619 deaths
16th-century Muslim scholars of Islam
17th-century Muslim scholars of Islam